Edward N. Kresge (July 31, 1935 - ) is a retired Exxon scientist, noted for his development of ethylene-propylene viscosity index modifiers, polyolefin thermoplastic elastomers, and tailored molecular weight density EPDM elastomers.

Education

Ph.D. University of Florida

Career

 1961 - joined Exxon, working under Francis P. Baldwin and later Albert M. Gessler
 1993 - retired from Exxon

Awards

 1976 - National Inventors Hall of Fame Medal.
 1993 - Arnold Smith Award from the ACS Rubber Division.
 1995 - Melvin Mooney Distinguished Technology Award
 1998 - Midgley award of the American Chemical Society for his role in the development of thermoplastic elastomer polyolefin blends for automobile bumpers
 2010 - Charles Goodyear Medal of the Rubber Division of the American Chemical Society.

References

Living people
Polymer scientists and engineers
21st-century American engineers
Place of birth missing (living people)
Year of birth missing (living people)
ExxonMobil people